Carlos Anckermann Riera (10 March 1829 – 17 February 1909) was a Cuban musician, composer and teacher. Born in Palma de Mallorca, Spain, he moved to Havana at the age of 18, where he played clarinet in a military band and violin at the Tacón Theatre. He taught at the Hubert de Blanck Conservatory and recorded with pianist Federico Edelmann (1795–1848). He composed numerous religious pieces, such as the Gran Misa, as well as chamber music, zarzuelas, contradanzas and ''fantasías.

His sons also became notable composers and musicians: Jorge Anckermann (1877–1941) and Fernando Anckermann (1890–1933).

References

1829 births
1909 deaths
People from Palma de Mallorca
People from Havana
Cuban clarinetists
Cuban classical violinists
Cuban classical composers